Typhoon Aere, known in the Philippines as Typhoon Marce, was a mid-season category two typhoon that brought severe damage to Taiwan and the People's Republic of China in August 2004. Aere is the Marshallese word for 'storm'.

Meteorological history

An area of convection developed approximately 250 miles east of Pohnpei late on August 13. By August 16, the disturbance had passed 40 miles north of Chuuk. It developed enough organization to be designated a tropical depression on August 19, about 400 miles west of Guam. From there, it moved northwest at 12 mph along the southwestern periphery of a mid-level steering ridge. The system reached tropical storm status on August 20, gaining the name Aere.

Preparations

Impact

News sources to date indicate that Taiwan took the brunt of Typhoon Aere. Thirty-four people were killed as a result of the storm, and fifteen died as a mudslide buried a remote mountain village in the north of the island. Agricultural losses were estimated at 7.7 million New Taiwan dollars (US$313,000 in 2004, US$321,451 in 2005). Forty-three deaths in the Philippines were caused by heavy rains induced by the typhoon. Nearly 16,000 people were evacuated from homes engulfed in floodwaters. A swollen river near the northern province of Nueva Ecija blocked traffic on a main road and stranded hundreds of commuters overnight. Eight provinces in northern and central Luzon were most severely affected with 70% of the provinces under water at one point.

Naming
Additionally, the name Kodo was replaced in 2002 without being used. The name Aere was chosen to replace the name.

See also

 List of wettest tropical cyclones
 Typhoon Fitow
 Typhoon Matmo (2014)
 Typhoon Saola (2012)

References

External links

JMA General Information of Typhoon Aere (0417) from Digital Typhoon
The JMA's Best Track Data on Typhoon Aere (0417) 
The JMA's RSMC Best Track Data (Graphics) on Typhoon Aere (0417)
The JMA's RSMC Best Track Data (Text)
The JTWC's Best Track Data on Typhoon 20W (Aere)
20W.AERE from the U.S. Naval Research Laboratory
 BBC slideshow

2004 Pacific typhoon season
M
M
Typhoons in China
Typhoons in Taiwan
Typhoon Aere
2004 in Taiwan
Typhoons
Aere